Botrucnidiferidae is a family of cnidarians belonging to the order Spirularia.

Genera

Genera:
 Genus Angianthula Leloup, 1964
 Genus Atractanthula Leloup, 1964
 Genus Botruanthus McMurrich, 1910
 Genus Botrucnidiata Leloup, 1932
 Genus Botrucnidifer Carlgren, 1912
 Genus Calpanthula van Beneden, 1897
 Genus Cerianthula Beneden, 1898
 Genus Gymnanthula Leloup, 1964
 Genus Hensenanthula van Beneden, 1897
 Genus Ovanthula van Beneden, 1897
 Genus Sphaeranthula Leloup, 1955

References

 
Spirularia
Cnidarian families